Anna Szwedyczka (died 12 March 1678), was an alleged Polish witch and a central figure in a high-profile Polish witch trial. She was executed for witchcraft by burning in Lublin.  

She is the subject of the play Klątwy ('The Curse') by Marcin Liber.

References

1678 deaths
People executed by Poland
17th-century executions by Poland
People executed for witchcraft
People executed by Poland by burning
Witch trials in Poland